The Hardin County Courthouse is the courthouse of Hardin County in Kountze, Texas.

The current structure was built in 1959. It is preceded by three other courthouses, no longer existing, constructed in 1859, 1872, and 1904.

In 2013, it was named one of the "Five Of The Ugliest Texas County Courthouses" by Houstonia magazine.

See also

List of county courthouses in Texas

References

Buildings and structures in Hardin County, Texas
County courthouses in Texas
Buildings and structures completed in 1959